Chen Kaige (born 12 August 1952) is a Chinese film director and a leading figure of the fifth generation of Chinese cinema. His films are known for their visual flair and epic storytelling. Chen won the Palme d'Or at 1993 Cannes Film Festival and the International Federation of Film Critics (FIPRESCI) Award in 1993 for directing Farewell My Concubine.

In recent years, Chen directed the war film The Battle at Lake Changjin and its sequel with Tsui Hark and Dante Lam, with the two films characterized by his signature storytelling and made in cooperation with the Chinese Communist Party.

Early life
Chen Kaige was born in Beijing, China into a family of Changle, Fuzhou origin, and grew up with fellow Fifth Generation alumnus Tian Zhuangzhuang as a childhood friend. His father  was a well-known director in his own right. His mother Liu Yanchi was a senior screenwriter. During the Cultural Revolution, Chen joined the Red Guards. As a teenage member of the Red Guards, Chen, like many other youths, denounced his own father, a fateful decision he eventually learned to regret. Indeed, this period of his life continues to influence much of his work today, notably in the unblinking depictions of the Cultural Revolution in Farewell My Concubine, and in the father-son relationship in Together. In 1969, Chen became a sent-down youth in Xishuangbanna Agricultural Reclamation Bureau for a short while before enlisting the People's Liberation Army (PLA) next year. In 1975, Chen was discharged from the army and returned to Beijing, where he worked as a worker in Beijing Film Printing Factory. Chen in 1978 joined the Beijing Film Academy, where he graduated in 1982 as part of the so-called Fifth Generation of Chinese filmmakers.

Directorial career
Upon graduating, Chen was assigned to the Guangxi Film Studio, along with a fellow graduate, Zhang Yimou. His first movie, Yellow Earth (1984), established itself as one of the most important works of Fifth Generation filmmaking; though simple, its powerful visual imagery (courtesy of cinematography by Zhang) and revolutionary storytelling style marked a sea change in how films were seen and perceived in the People's Republic of China. The Big Parade (1986) and King of the Children (1987) expanded on his filmic repertoire. In 1987, he was awarded a fellowship by the Asian Cultural Council and served as a visiting scholar at the New York University Film School. Early in 1989, he did further experimenting in a music video for the song "Do You Believe In Shame" by Duran Duran.  Later that year, he made Life on a String, a highly esoteric movie which uses mythical allegory and lush scenery to tell the story of a blind sanxian musician and his student. In the same year, he was a member of the jury at the 39th Berlin International Film Festival.

His most famous film in the West, Farewell My Concubine (1993), nominated for two Academy Awards and winner of the Palme d'Or at 1993 Cannes Film Festival, follows two Beijing opera stars through decades of change in China during the twentieth century.  Chen followed up the unprecedented success of Farewell My Concubine with Temptress Moon (1996), another period drama starring Leslie Cheung and Gong Li. Though it was well received by most critics, it did not achieve the accolades that Concubine did, and many were put off by the film's convoluted plot line. Almost as famous is his The Emperor and the Assassin (1999), an epic involving the legendary King of Qin and the reluctant assassin who aims to kill him.

In 2002, Chen made his first, and to-date only, English-language film, Killing Me Softly, a thriller starring Heather Graham and Joseph Fiennes, though it proved to be both a critical and popular disappointment. His more recent Together (2002) is an intimate film about a young violinist and his father. In 2005, he directed The Promise, a fantasy wuxia picture. The Promise saw Chen shifting to a more commercial mindset, a shift regarded by some as a "radical stylistic turn" from his previous works.

In 2006, he was awarded the Lifetime Achievement Award at the 28th Moscow International Film Festival.

In 2008, Chen directed the semi-biography Forever Enthralled, which is a return for him in the sense of directing a film based on Chinese opera. He later went on to direct Sacrifice (2010), which is a re-imagining of the famous play The Orphan of Zhao. The film was a box-office hit and many critics saw it as his "return to form".

Chen has also acted in several films, including Bernardo Bertolucci's The Last Emperor (1987) and his own The Emperor and the Assassin and Together.

His 2012 film Caught in the Web was selected as the Chinese entry for the Best Foreign Language Oscar at the 85th Academy Awards, but it did not make the final shortlist.

Personal life 
Chen's first wife was Sun Jialin, whom he met while working at the Beijing Film Factory, between 1975 and 1978; they married in 1983. That union ended and he later remarried, to Hong Huang, the daughter of Zhang Hanzhi, a diplomat who had worked as an English translator for Mao Zedong. She graduated from Vassar College in New York and is the current CEO of China Interactive Media Group. In the early 1990s, after their divorce, Chen lived with Ni Ping, a female television personality. In 1996, Chen married actress Chen Hong.

Chen Kaige is the holder of a green card to the United States.

Filmography

Film (as director)

Television (as director)

Actor

Writer

Producer

Awards and nominations

International

Domestic

See also

 Zhang Yimou
 Tian Zhuangzhuang

Notes

External links
 Chen Kaige at They Shoot Pictures, Don't They?
 
 
Chen Kaige: "Freedom Above All Else"''
Chen Kaige – Star of Chinese Fifth-Generation Cinema Directors
Chen Kaige at the Hong Kong Movie Database

1952 births
Living people
Asian Cultural Council grantees
Filmmakers who won the Best Foreign Language Film BAFTA Award
Beijing Film Academy alumni
Film directors from Beijing
Sent-down youths
Beijing No. 4 High School alumni
Directors of Palme d'Or winners
Members of the 12th Chinese People's Political Consultative Conference